Amaua is a village in the southeast of Tutuila Island, American Samoa. It is located on the north shore of Faga'itua Bay between Alega and Faga'itua.

Amaua's mayor, Pulenu'u Troy Fia-ui, was taken into custody by the police in January 2011 after marijuana plants were discovered by his home.

As of 2010, Amaua had a 94.8 high school graduation percent, which was among the highest recorded of any village in American Samoa.

Demographics

References

Villages in American Samoa